This is a list of largest United Kingdom employers. There are four main kinds of employer,

 public sector bodies
 public listed companies (plc) such as those on the FTSE 100
 private companies (ltd), partnerships (often LLP) or other traders
 charitable sector organisations

Public sector employers
Partial statistics for public bodies are available from the Office for National Statistics. As of September 2018, public sector employees represent 16.5% of all people in paid work, with the remaining 83.5% employed in the private sector.

Public listed company employers

Statistics are available on an ad hoc basis from public company annual reports.

Currently Tesco and Compass Group are the largest plc employers.

Private company employers

Statistics on staff numbers were compiled in the Sunday Times "Top Track 100" of private companies for 2012. The three  largest private employers in that list were John Lewis Partnership, Swire Group and Alliance Boots.

See also
 UK labour law
 UK company law
 FTSE 100 and FT 30
 List of UK trade unions
 List of largest employers
 List of German companies by employees in 1938
 List of German companies by employees in 1907
 List of private equity firms
 List of corporate scandals

Notes

Employment in the United Kingdom
Largest employers
Employers, largest
Employers
Employers